This is a list of schools in County Durham, England (Durham County Council area).

State-funded schools

Primary schools

Acre Rigg Academy, Peterlee
Acre Rigg Infant School, Peterlee
All Saints RC Primary school, Lanchester
Annfield Plain Infant School, Annfield Plain
Annfield Plain Junior School, Annfield Plain
Aycliffe Village Primary School, Newton Aycliffe 
Beamish Primary school, Beamish
Bearpark Primary school, Bearpark
Belmont Cheveley Park Primary School, Belmont
Belmont CE Primary School, Belmont
Benfieldside Primary School, Consett
Bishop Ian Ramsey CE Primary School, Consett
Blackhall Primary School, Consett
Blessed John Duckett RC Primary School, Tow Law
Bloemfontein Primary School, Stanley
Blue Coat CE Junior School, Newton Hall
Bluebell Meadow Primary School, Trimdon/Trimdon Grange
Bournmoor Primary school, Bournmoor
Bowburn Primary School, Bowburn
Bowes Hutchinson's CE School, Bowes
Brandon Primary School, Brandon
Broom Cottages Primary School, Ferryhill
Browney Primary Academy, Browney
Bullion Lane Primary School Chester-le-Street
Burnhope Primary School, Burnhope
Burnopfield Primary School, Burnopfield
Butterknowle Primary School, Butterknowle
Byerley Park Primary School, Newton Aycliffe
Byers Green Primary School, Byers Green
Cassop Primary School, Cassop
Castleside Primary School, Castleside
Catchgate Primary School, Annfield Plain
Cestria Primary School, Chester-le-Street
Chester le Street CE Primary School, Chester-le-Street 
Chilton Academy, Chilton
Cleves Cross Primary and Nursery Academy, Ferryhill
Cockfield Primary School, Cockfield
Cockton Hill Infant School, Bishop Auckland
Cockton Hill Junior School, Bishop Auckland
Collierley Primary School, Dipton
Consett Infant School, Consett
Consett Junior School, Consett
Copeland Road Primary School, West Auckland
Cotherstone Primary School, Cotherstone
Cotsford Primary School, Horden
Coxhoe Primary School, Coxhoe
Crook Primary School, Crook
Deaf Hill Primary School, Deaf Hill
Dean Bank Primary School, Ferryhill
Delves Lane Primary School, Consett
Dene House Primary School, Peterlee
Durham Gilesgate Primary School, Gilesgate
Durham Newton Hall Infants' School, Newton Hall
Easington CE Primary School, Easington
Easington Colliery Primary School, Easington Colliery
East Stanley School, Stanley
Ebchester CE Primary School, Ebchester
Edmondsley Primary School, Edmondsley
Escomb Primary School, Escomb
Esh CE Primary School, Esh
Esh Winning Primary School, Esh Winning
Etherley Lane Primary School, Bishop Auckland
Evenwood CE Primary School Evenwood
Ferryhill Station Primary School, Ferryhill
Finchale Primary School, Newton Hall
Fishburn Primary School, Fishburn
Framwellgate Moor Primary School, Framwellgate Moor
Frosterley Primary School Frosterley
Gainford CE Primary School, Gainford
Green Lane CE Primary School, Barnard Castle
Greenland Community Primary School, South Moor
The Grove Primary School, Consett
Hamsterley Primary School, Hamsterley
Hartside Primary Academy, Crook
Hesleden Primary School, Hesleden
Horndale Infants' School, Newton Aycliffe
Howden-le-Wear Primary School, Howden-le-Wear
Howletch Lane Primary School, Peterlee
Hunwick Primary School, Hunwick
Hutton Henry CE Primary School, Hutton Henry
Ingleton CE Primary School, Ingleton
Kelloe Primary School, Kelloe
King Street Primary School, Spennymoor
Kirk Merrington Primary School, Kirk Merrington
Lanchester Parochial Primary School, Lanchester
Langley Moor Primary School, Langley Moor
Langley Park Primary School, Langley Park
Laurel Avenue Community Primary School, Gilesgate
Leadgate Primary School, Leadgate
Ludworth Primary School, Ludworth
Lumley Infant and Nursery School, Great Lumley
Lumley Junior School, Great Lumley
Middlestone Moor Primary Academy, Spennymoor
Middleton-in-Teesdale Primary School, Middleton-in-Teesdale
Montalbo Primary School, Barnard Castle
Moorside Primary Academy, Consett
Nettlesworth Primary School, Nettlesworth
Neville's Cross Primary School, Neville's Cross
New Brancepeth Primary Academy, New Brancepeth
New Seaham Academy, Seaham
Newker Primary School, Chester-le-Street
North Park Primary School, Spennymoor
Oakley Cross Primary School, West Auckland
Our Lady & St Joseph's RC Primary School, Leadgate
Our Lady & St Thomas RC Primary School, Willington
Our Lady of Lourdes RC Primary School, Shotton Colliery
Our Lady of the Rosary RCVA Primary School, Peterlee
Our Lady Queen of Martyrs' RC Primary School, Esh Winning
Our Lady Star of the Sea RC Primary School, Horden
Ouston Primary School, Ouston, County Durham
Ox Close Primary School, Spennymoor
Peases West Primary School, Billy Row
Pelton Community Primary School, Pelton
Pittington Primary School, Pittington
Prince Bishop's Community Primary School, Close House
Ramshaw Primary School, Evenwood
Red Rose Primary School, Chester-le-Street
Ribbon School, Murton
Rookhope Primary School, Rookhope
Ropery Walk Primary School, Seaham
Rosa Street Primary School, Spennymoor
Roseberry Primary and Nursery School, Pelton
Sacriston Academy, Sacriston
Seascape Primary School, Peterlee
St Andrew's Primary School, Bishop Auckland
St Anne's CE Primary School, Bishop Auckland
St Bede's RC Primary School, Sacriston
St Benet's RC Primary School, Ouston
St Chad's RC Primary School, Witton Park
St Charles' RC Primary School, Spennymoor
St Cuthbert's RC Primary School, Chester-le-Street
St Cuthbert's RC Primary School, Crook
St Cuthbert's RC Primary School, Seaham
St Francis CE Junior School, Newton Aycliffe
St Godric's RC Primary School, Framwellgate Moor
St Godric's RC Primary School, Wheatley Hill
St Helen Auckland Community Primary School, St Helen Auckland
St Hild's College CE Primary School, Durham
St John's Chapel Primary School, St John's Chapel
St John's CE Primary School, Shildon
St Joseph's RC Primary School, Blackhall Colliery
St Joseph's RC Primary School, Coundon
St Joseph's RC Primary School, Durham
St Joseph's RC Primary School, Murton
St Joseph's RC Primary School, Newton Aycliffe
St Joseph's RC Primary School, Stanley
St Joseph's RC Primary School, Ushaw Moor
St Margaret's CE Primary School, Durham
St Mary Magdalen's RC Primary School, Seaham
St Mary's RC Primary School, Barnard Castle
St Mary's RC Primary School, Blackhill
St Mary's RC Primary School, Newton Aycliffe
St Mary's RC Primary School, South Moor
St Mary's RC Primary School, Wingate
St Michael's CE Primary School, Bishop Middleham
St Michael's RC Primary School, Esh
St Oswald's CE Primary and Nursery School, Durham
St Patrick's RC Primary School, Consett
St Patrick's RC Primary School, Dipton
St Patrick's RC Primary School, Langley Moor
St Pius X RC Primary School, Consett
St Stephen's CE Primary School, Willington
St Thomas More RC Primary School, Belmont
St Wilfrid's RC Primary School, Bishop Auckland
St William's RC Primary School, Trimdon
Seaham Trinity Primary School, Seaham
Seascape Primary School, Peterlee
Seaview Primary School, Deneside
Sedgefield Hardwick Primary Academy, Sedgefield
Sedgefield Primary School, Sedgefield
Sherburn Primary school, Sherburn
Shield Row Primary School, Shield Row
Shincliffe CE Primary School, High Shincliffe
Shotley Bridge Primary School, Shotley Bridge
Shotton Hall Primary School, Peterlee
Shotton Primary School, Shotton Colliery
Silver Tree Primary School and Nursery, Ushaw Moor
South Hetton Primary, South Hetton
South Stanley Infant and Nursery School, South Stanley
South Stanley Junior School, South Stanley
Staindrop CE Primary School, Staindrop
Stanhope Barrington CE Primary School, Stanhope
Stanley Crook Primary School, Stanley Crook
Stanley Burnside Primary School, South Stanley
Stephenson Way Academy, Newton Aycliffe
Sugar Hill Primary School, Newton Aycliffe
Sunnybrow Primary School, Crook
Tanfield Lea Community Primary School, Tanfield Lea
Thornhill Primary School, Shildon
Thornley Primary School, Thornley
Timothy Hackworth Primary School, Shildon
Toft Hill Primary School, Toft Hill
Tow Law Millennium Primary School, Tow Law
Tudhoe Colliery Primary School, Tudhoe
Vane Road Primary School, Newton Aycliffe
Victoria Lane Academy, Coundon
Wearhead Primary School, Wearhead
West Cornforth Primary School, West Cornforth
West Pelton Primary School, West Pelton
West Rainton Primary School, West Rainton
Westlea Primary School, Seaham
Wheatley Hill Community Primary School, Wheatley Hill
Willington Primary School, Willington
Wingate Primary School, Wingate
Witton Gilbert Primary School, Witton Gilbert
Witton-le-Wear Primary School, Witton-le-Wear
Wolsingham Primary School, Wolsingham
Woodham Burn Community Primary School, Newton Aycliffe
Woodhouse Community Primary School, Bishop Auckland
Woodland Primary School, Woodland
Woodlea Primary School, Fence Houses
Yohden Primary School, Horden

Secondary schools 

Belmont Community School, Durham
Bishop Barrington Academy, Bishop Auckland
Consett Academy, Consett
Dene Academy, Peterlee
Durham Academy, Ushaw Moor
Durham Johnston Comprehensive School, Durham
Easington Academy, Easington
Ferryhill Business and Enterprise College, Ferryhill
Framwellgate School Durham, Durham
Greenfield Community College, Newton Aycliffe
Hermitage Academy, Chester-le-Street
King James I Academy, Bishop Auckland
North Durham Academy, Stanley
Park View School, Chester-le-Street
Parkside Academy, Willington
St Bede's Catholic School, Lanchester
St Bede's Catholic School, Peterlee
St John's Catholic School, Bishop Auckland
St Leonard's Catholic School, Durham
Seaham School of Technology, Seaham
Sedgefield Community College, Sedgefield
Shotton Hall Academy, Peterlee
Staindrop Academy, Staindrop
Tanfield School, Stanley
Teesdale School, Barnard Castle
UTC South Durham, Newton Aycliffe
Wellfield School, Wingate
Whitworth Park Academy, Spennymoor
Wolsingham School, Wolsingham
Woodham Academy, Newton Aycliffe

Special and alternative schools

Croft Community School, Annfield Plain
Durham Trinity School, Durham
Elemore Hall School, Pittington
Endeavour Academy Durham, Peterlee
Evergreen Primary School, Bishop Auckland
Hope Wood Academy, Easington Colliery
The Meadows School, Spennymoor
The Oaks Secondary School, Spennymoor
Villa Real School, Consett
Walworth School, Newton Aycliffe
The Woodlands, Ferryhill

Further education
 Bishop Auckland College
 Derwentside College, Lanchester
 Durham Sixth Form Centre, Durham
 East Durham College, Durham
 New College Durham

Independent schools

Primary and preparatory schools
The Independent Grammar School, Durham

Senior and all-through schools
Barnard Castle School, Barnard Castle
Durham High School, Durham
Durham School, Durham

Special and alternative schools
Delta Independent School, Consett
The Grange Learning Centre, Low Willington
Highcroft School, Bishop Auckland
North East Centre for Autism - Aycliffe School, Newton Aycliffe

Further education
Thornbeck College

References

External links
 Schools - Durham County Council

Durham
Schools in County Durham
Lists of buildings and structures in County Durham